Osborne Park may refer to:

 Osborne Park, New South Wales, a locality of Sydney
 Osborne Park, Western Australia, a suburb of Perth
 Osborne Park (Willoughby, Ohio), an urban park in the United States